List of Elle (India) cover models attempts to catalogue all people who have appeared as cover models on the Indian edition of Elle magazine, starting with the magazine's first issue in December 1996.

1996–1997

1998

1999

2000

2001

2002

2003

2004

2005

2006

2007

2008

2009

2010

2011

2012

2013

2014

2015

2016

2017

2018

2019

2020

References

External links
 Elle India Cover Archive

India
2000s in India
2010s in India